Anandhi (born Rakshita; 10 December 1996) is an Indian actress who primarily appears in Tamil and Telugu films. After her debut in the Telugu film Bus Stop (2012), she appeared in Vetrimaaran's Tamil production Poriyaalan and Prabhu Solomon's Kayal (2014). She won Special Prize for Kayal at the Tamil Nadu State Film Awards.

Early life 
Anandhi was born on 10 December 1996 in a Telugu family in Warangal, Telangana.

Career
Anandhi made her debut with Maruthi's coming-of-age film Bus Stop (2012). Critics responded positively. Her next film, Priyathama Neevachata Kushalama, opened in March 2013 to negative reviews, though a critic claimed that "the saving grace for the film is performance of the lead pair - Varun Sandesh and Hasika", adding that Hasika "looks traditional and has put up a decent show as well."

Anandhi was next seen in Vijay Maddala's next directorial venture Green Signal, where she appeared alongside newcomer Revanth, though the film garnered negative reviews. In early 2013, she had also signed on to appear in the Tamil film, Poriyaalan alongside Harish Kalyan, written by Manimaran. During production, the scope of the film became larger after it was announced that director Vetrimaaran had chosen to invest in the venture as a co-producer.

Anandhi appeared in Prabhu Solomon's directorial venture Kayal, in which she plays the title role. The director decided to rechristen her as Anandhi from Rakshita for the film, and she was selected after auditioning twice before impressing Solomon. Her performance received praise. She was nominated for several Best Debut Actress awards for 2014, including at the Vijay Awards.

In 2015, Anandhi's first release was in A. Sarkunam's Chandi Veeran produced by Bala, in which she portrayed the romantic interest of Atharvaa's character. Anandhi then worked on the adult comedy flick Trisha Illana Nayanthara (2015) starring alongside G. V. Prakash Kumar. Post-release, Anandhi revealed her displeasure at working with the director and revealed that she was led to believe that the film would be a "cute love story" and not an "adult comedy". Anandhi nonetheless helped to promote the release of the film's Telugu version. In 2016, she played a small role in Visaranai, followed by two films with G. V. Prakash Kumar in Enakku Innoru Per Irukku and Kadavul Irukaan Kumaru. In 2017, her films were Rubaai, Pandigai and En Aaloda Seruppa Kaanom. In 2018, she appeared in Mari Selvaraj's  debut film Pariyerum Perumal, one of the best Tamil films made on caste discrimination and the pain of the oppressed people. The film was released to positive reviews, while the cast's performance was critically acclaimed. Her next project was Irandam Ulagaporin Kadaisi Gundu (2019). Anandhi's character in the film was similar to that she played in Pariyerum Perumal.

Anandhi appeared in the web series Live Telecast directed by Venkat Prabhu and starring Kajal Aggarwal and Vaibhav Reddy.

Personal life
Anandhi married Socrates on 7 January 2021 in Warangal, Telangana. He is a marine engineer turned assistant director, philosopher and brother-in-law of Moodar Koodam–fame director Naveen, notable for working in Alaudhinin Arputha Camera and Agni Siragugal.

Filmography

Films

Television

References

External links
 
 
 

Indian film actresses
Living people
1993 births
Actresses in Tamil cinema
Actresses in Telugu cinema
Actresses from Telangana
People from Warangal
21st-century Indian actresses
Telugu actresses
Actresses in Malayalam cinema